Hisham Arafat 
() is a former Transport Minister of Egypt in the cabinet headed by Sherif Ismail from 19 February 2017 to 27 February 2019 -in succession to Minister Galal Saeed- and resigned shortly after the Ramses Station rail disaster.

Qualifications 
Hisham holds the following degrees:
 Bachelor of Engineering from Ain Shams University in 1985. 
 Master's degree from the same university in 1991
 Doctor's Degree from Ain Shams University and the University of Braunschweig in Germany.

Personal life 
Arafat is married to an engineer who works in the private sector. they have two sons who graduated from the German University - the first  from the Department of Electrical and Communications, and the second is a mechanic.

See also 
 Ministry of Transportation (Egypt) 
 Ramses Station rail disaster 
 Kamel al-Wazir

References

 

Transport ministers of Egypt
Ain Shams University alumni
Egyptian Muslims
Living people
Egyptian engineers
1964 births